Archidendron clypearia subsp. subcoriaceum is a subspecies of an Archidendron clypearia in the legume family (Fabaceae). It is found in India and Sri Lanka.

References

External links

clypearia subsp. subcoriaceum
Flora of India (region)
Flora of Sri Lanka
Plant subspecies